Saltora Netaji Centenary College, established in 2001, is the general degree college in Saltora, Bankura district. It offers undergraduate courses in arts. It is affiliated with Bankura University.

History

Saltora Netaji Centenary College was established to promote higher education in  Saltora and its adjoining areas. There was a demand and need of a degree college in this area for a long time. In 1997 in a public meeting it was decided that a degree college would be established .University of Burdwan affiliated it from the session 2001–02 and it started with 58 students. Initially college classes were held at Saltora by Dr. B.C. Vidyapith. It moved to its own building in May 2001.

Main initiated was taken by  Mr . Nazibar Rahaman (Ast. Teacher Saltora Dr B C Vidyapith).  The path which whole movement travelled it looked like a mass revolution. 

The college is named to show respect Netaji Subash Chandra Bose on the eve of his birth centenary.

Location
It is beside Saltora-Majia Bus Road at Saltora.

Departments

This college offers General Course in Arts and Hons.

B.A honors
English-60

B.A ganaral

Accreditation
The college is recognized by the University Grants Commission (UGC).

See also

References

External links
Saltora Netaji Centenary College

Universities and colleges in Bankura district
Colleges affiliated to Bankura University
Educational institutions established in 2001
2001 establishments in West Bengal